Sabrina's Secret Life (French: Le Secret de Sabrina) is a 2003 animated television series based on the Archie Comics character Sabrina, the Teenage Witch co-produced by DIC Entertainment Corporation and Les Studios Tex SARL. It originally aired in syndication on the DIC Kids Network block in 2003 as a sequel series to Sabrina: The Animated Series (and Sabrina: Friends Forever).

This was the final series to be produced by Les Studios Tex, as they ceased operations around the time the show ended.

Overview
In this series, Sabrina Spellman is 14 years old (two years older than she was in Sabrina: The Animated Series and one year older than she was in the Friends Forever movie, but still younger than usually portrayed in the comics) attending Greendale High School. Chloe and her family have moved away, Gem Stone attends a private school far away from Greendale and Uncle Quigley, Pi and the Spookie Jar have mysteriously vanished. Sabrina's new best friend is a girl named Maritza; additionally, Sabrina still has a crush on her friend Harvey. Although Sabrina's Secret Life is set during her high school years, Sabrina's magic is considerably less strong than it was in the original series. Unlike the previous series, where Sabrina made magic with a wave of her hand and an incantation, here she uses a wand to cast spells. Most of the original voice cast did not return for this series.

Characters
 Sabrina Spellman (voiced by Britt McKillip, reprising her role from Friends Forever) is a 14-year-old freshman at Greendale High and had grown and matured since Sabrina: The Animated Series ended. She secretly has her courses of magic and witchcraft with Cassandra. Her character and personality are still the same and she still has her romantic crush on Harvey. She also wears a different midriff dress than the previous series.
 Salem Saberhagen (voiced by Maurice LaMarche) did not change in this series, as he still helps Sabrina with her problems. He has also taken over Uncle Quigley's role as the voice of reason for Sabrina.
 Hilda Spellman and Zelda Spellman are Sabrina's paternal aunts who help their niece with her increasingly powerful magical abilities and proper uses of magic.
 Harvey Kinkle (voiced by Michael Heyward) is portrayed as more grown-up, attractive, athletic and smarter but, at the same time, much ditzier than in the original series. He has the same romantic crush on Sabrina and still does not know her magical and mystical secret.
 Cassandra (voiced by Tifanie Christun) is Enchantra's niece and Sabrina's best friend-turned-enemy who goes with Sabrina to the same witchcraft courses. In the beginning, she served as Gem Stone's replacement, but she gets kinder progressively. In the end, she and Sabrina become best friends again. 
 Maritza (voiced by Vanesa Tomasino) is Sabrina's new best friend and Chloe's replacement. She's very similar to Chloe physically and emotionally but, unlike her, she does not know that Sabrina is a witch.
 Queen Enchantra is the Queen of all witches. She is portrayed much warmer, friendlier, nicer and kinder than she was in Sabrina: The Animated Series.
 Ms. Magrooney is Sabrina's teacher in both the Human World and The Netherworld.
 Mr. Snipe is Sabrina's teacher in both the Human World and The Netherworld.

Episodes

Production
On October 7, 2002, DIC announced the series' production, which they revealed that the popularity of the live-action sitcom led the company to produce a new Sabrina cartoon to follow up on Sabrina: The Animated Series. DIC also confirmed that Sabrina's Secret Life would be shown off at MIPCOM 2002 for a fall 2003 release.

Broadcast
The series was first pre-sold internationally at Mipcom 2002. In November 2002, DIC announced pre-sale rights were sold to Super RTL in Germany, Televisa in Latin America, Fox Kids in Italy, Noga Communications in Israel and Saran in Turkey.

In 2004, Disney Channels Worldwide purchased the pay rights to the series in United Kingdom, Asia, Taiwan, Australia, France, Latin America, Brazil, the Middle East, and Spain as part of a package with Sabrina: The Animated Series titled "Totally Sabrina", which would air on Disney Channel and Toon Disney networks. The package was also pre-sold to TF1 in France, RTÉ in Ireland, Mediaset in Italy, ORF in Austria, Alter Channel in Greece, FORTA in Spain, SBT in Brazil and Teletoon in Canada, alongside addition to broadcasters who already purchased Secret Life, like Super RTL, Noga Communications and Saran.

In the United States, the show aired on DIC's Syndicated programming block DIC Kids Network. The show also reran on Toon Disney and Disney Channel for a short time from 2004-2005 and on CBS as part of the network's KOL Secret Slumber Party block in 2006-2007 and later again as part of the network's Cookie Jar TV block from September 18, 2010 to January 29, 2011, when it was replaced by Trollz and Horseland; however, all DIC references in these later CBS broadcasts have been replaced by Cookie Jar references.

The show would later premiere in France on TF1 on October 25, 2004.

In Germany, the show broadcast as simply a third season of Sabrina, the Animated Series, both under the title Simsalabim Sabrina,.

See also
 Sabrina: The Animated Series
 Sabrina: Friends Forever
 Sabrina: Secrets of a Teenage Witch

References

External links
 

First-run syndicated television programs in the United States
2000s American animated television series
2000s American high school television series
2003 American television series debuts
2004 American television series endings
2003 French television series debuts
2004 French television series endings
2000s French animated television series
American children's animated action television series
American children's animated adventure television series
American children's animated fantasy television series
American sequel television series
English-language television shows
French children's animated action television series
French children's animated adventure television series
French children's animated fantasy television series
Television series by DIC Entertainment
Television series by DHX Media
Sabrina the Teenage Witch
Television shows based on Archie Comics
Disney Channel original programming
CBS original programming
Television about magic
Toon Disney original programming
Television series about witchcraft
YTV (Canadian TV channel) original programming
Animated television series about cats
Teen animated television series
Television series created by Jean Chalopin